Nemiroğlu is a village in Tarsus district of Mersin Province, Turkey.
The population of Nemiroğlu  was 119  as of 2012. Main economic activity is agriculture and grapes is the major crop of the village.

References

Villages in Tarsus District